Rosemary Fisher née Hayward (born 10 November 1980) is a retired Australian sprinter who competed in international elite events. She was a 2006 Commonwealth Games champion and a double World Junior bronze medalist in 400m events.

References

1980 births
Living people
Australian female sprinters
Athletes (track and field) at the 2006 Commonwealth Games
Commonwealth Games gold medallists for Australia
Commonwealth Games medallists in athletics
People educated at St Peter's Catholic College, Tuggerah
People from the Central Coast (New South Wales)
Sportswomen from New South Wales
21st-century Australian women
Medallists at the 2006 Commonwealth Games